The following lists events that happened during 2013 in Vietnam.

Incumbents
Party General Secretary: Nguyễn Phú Trọng
President: Trương Tấn Sang
Prime Minister: Nguyễn Tấn Dũng
Chairman of the National Assembly: Nguyễn Sinh Hùng

References

 
Vietnam
Years of the 21st century in Vietnam
2010s in Vietnam
Vietnam